James Francis Burke (8 April 1895 – 28 December 1987) was an Irish hurler, Gaelic footballer and revolutionary. His championship career as a dual player with the Dublin senior teams spanned ten years from 1917 until 1927.

Born in Carbury, County Kildare, Burke was educated locally before later boarding at St. Enda's School in Dublin. Under the influence of Patrick Pearse he joined the Irish Republican Brotherhood and was a founder-member of the Irish Volunteers in 1913. During the 1916 Easter Rising Burke was stationed in the General Post Office before later manning a barricade on Moore Street. His sister, Aoife de Búrca was a nurse in the GPO while he was there. After a period of internment in Stafford and Frongoch he returned to Dublin where took over as headmaster of St. Enda's School.

Burke enjoyed his first successes in competitive hurling and football during his studies at University College Dublin. A regular on the university's inter-varsities team he won five Sigerson Cup medals and four Fitzgibbon Cup medals between 1915 and 1924.

At club level Burke played with the Colegians team. As a hurler he won three successive county senior championship medals from 1917 to 1919.

Burke made his debut on the inter-county scene in 1914 when he was selected for the Dublin junior team. He won an All-Ireland medal that year before collecting a second in 1916. Burke subsequently joined the Dublin senior teams in both codes, making his debut in 1917. Over the course of the next decade he became one of the greatest and most successful dual players of all time, winning All-Ireland medals as a hurler in 1917 and 1920 before collecting three successive All-Ireland medals as a footballer from 1921 to 1923. Burke also won a total of nine Leinster medals. He played his last game for Dublin during the 1927 championship.

Honours

University College Dublin
Fitzgibbon Cup (4): 1915, 1916, 1917, 1924, 
Sigerson Cup (5): 1915, 1917, 1918, 1920, 1924,

Collegians
Dublin Senior Hurling Championship (3): 1917, 1918, 1919

Dublin
All-Ireland Senior Football Championship (3): 1921, 1922, 1923
All-Ireland Senior Hurling Championship (2): 1917, 1920
Leinster Senior Football Championship (5): 1920, 1921, 1922, 1923, 1924
Leinster Senior Hurling Championship (4): 1917, 1919, 1920, 1921
All-Ireland Junior Football Championship (2): 1914, 1916
Leinster Junior Football Championship (2): 1914, 1916

References

1895 births
1987 deaths
All-Ireland Senior Hurling Championship winners
Dual players
Dublin inter-county Gaelic footballers
Dublin inter-county hurlers
Irish schoolteachers
UCD Gaelic footballers
UCD hurlers
People educated at St. Enda's School